Kanu Roy (1912-1981) was an Indian actor and music composer in Hindi and Bengali films. 
He gave music for most of Basu Bhattacharya's films.

His most famous compositions are for Geeta Dutt, such as Aaj ki Kaalighata and Uski Kahani (1966), Lyrics: Kaifi Azmi, and the songs of Geeta Dutt's last film as a singer, Anubhav (1971) – "Koi Chupke Se Aake", "Mera Dil Jo Mera Hota" and "Meri Jaan Mujhe Jaan Na Kaho". He also gave two hits to Manna Dey in Anubhav – "Phir Koi Phool Khila" and in Avishkaar  – "Hansne Ki Chaah Ne Kitna Mujhe Rulaya Hai" and "Machal Ke Jab Bhi Aankhon Mein" by Bhupender Singh in Grihpravash (1979). In his early struggling years in Mumbai, he did small film roles, and gave film music whenever he got a chance.

The Jagjit and Chitra Singh rendition of "Babul Mora Naihar Chhooto Jaye" in Avishkaar (1973) is also fairly well known. His other films were not so successful, however.

Filmography
 Kismet (1943) – Actor
 Mahal (1949) – Actor
 Jagriti (1954) – Actor
 Munimji (1955) – Actor
 Ham Sab Chor Hain (1956) – Actor
 Tumsa Nahin Dekha (1957) – Actor
 Naughty Boy (1962) – Actor
 Bandini (1963) – Actor
 Uski Kahani (1966) – Music
 Anubhav (1971) – Music
 Avishkaar (1973) – Music
 Tumhara Kalloo (1975) – Music
 Griha Pravesh (1979) – Music
 Sparsh (1980) – Music
 Shyamla (1980) – Music
 Kissi Se Na Kehna (1983) – Actor

References

External links

Indian male film actors
Bengali musicians
1981 deaths
University of Calcutta alumni
Male actors in Hindi cinema
Hindi film score composers
1912 births